The Stone Building, built in 1833, is an historic Greek Revival style building located at 735 Massachusetts Avenue in Lexington, Massachusetts. It was originally a meeting hall and lyceum for East Lexington, which had its own civic identity and, later, its own church, the neighboring Follen Community Church.  Notable speakers at the Lyceum included Ralph Waldo Emerson, Charles Sumner, Wendell Phillips, Theodore Parker, Lucy Stone, Josiah Quincy, Jr. and possibly Henry David Thoreau. Emerson notably served as a minister in the building for three years prior to the building of Follen Community Church. 

The building was deeded to the Trustees of the Cary Memorial Library for $2,000 in 1891, by Ellen Stone, granddaughter of Eli Robbins, who built it, and it was named after her. After her death in 1944, she bequeathed $2,000 to the Town for a fund to aid needy and deserving girls in pursuit of education. The East Lexington branch library which had been established in 1883, occupied it until the building was closed for repairs in 2007.

In 1945 a demolition permit was issued for the building followed by several attempts to find a new site on which to locate it. Ultimately it was renovated as the East Branch of Cary Memorial Library in 1947.

It was listed on the National Register of Historic Places in 1976.

Current status
In August, 2007, the building suffered damage from burst pipes, and was closed for repairs. The East Lexington Library never reopened. 

In February 2009, the Cary Memorial Library Board of Trustees announced their decision to use the Stone Building as a Lexington Heritage Center which never came to fruition.

In August 2020, the Lexington Select Board revived the proposal for the Ad Hoc Stone Building Feasibility/Re-Use Committee to find a purpose for this historic building after being unused for 13 years.

See also
National Register of Historic Places listings in Middlesex County, Massachusetts

References

External links

 History of Cary Memorial Library, including the East Lexington Library
 Ellen Stone Building Preservation Study Documents
 2009 Presentation on restoration progress noting history of the building with historic pictures.
  Bradford Smith, “History of the Stone Building,” Proceedings of the Lexington Historical Society Vol. II (Lexington, Massachusetts: Lexington Historical Society, 1900)

Gallery

Cultural infrastructure completed in 1833
Event venues on the National Register of Historic Places in Massachusetts
Buildings and structures in Lexington, Massachusetts
Libraries in Middlesex County, Massachusetts
National Register of Historic Places in Middlesex County, Massachusetts